La seconda ombra is an Italian film directed by Silvano Agosti in 2000.

Most of the cast were people who had actually worked or lived in psychiatric hospitals in Gorizia and Trieste.

Plot
The film deals with developments related to the activities of Franco Basaglia, director of the psychiatric hospital in Gorizia and promoter of Law 180.

References

External links

Further reading 
 

2000 films
2000s Italian-language films
Films set in Italy
Films directed by Silvano Agosti
Films shot in Rome
Films set in the 20th century
Italian historical drama films
Films set in psychiatric hospitals
2000s historical drama films
2000 drama films
2000s Italian films